Walser Hammerspitze is a mountain of Bavaria, Germany. The former name was Schüsser.

Mountains of Bavaria
Mountains of the Alps